Harry Thuillier (13 September 1922 – 26 April 2011) was an Irish fencer, table tennis international and broadcaster. He was educated at St. Vincent's C.B.S., Glasnevin. He competed in the individual foil events at the 1952 and 1960 Summer Olympics.

He also represented Ireland at table tennis and was part of the Irish team that competed in the 1947 World Table Tennis Championships.

References

External links
 

1922 births
2011 deaths
Irish male épée fencers
Irish broadcasters
Olympic fencers of Ireland
Fencers at the 1952 Summer Olympics
Fencers at the 1960 Summer Olympics
Irish table tennis players
Irish male foil fencers
People educated at St. Vincent's C.B.S., Glasnevin